Richard Douglas Henry (born December 10, 1963) is an American former professional baseball relief pitcher and current coach.

Career
Henry played for the Milwaukee Brewers (1991–94), New York Mets (1995–96), San Francisco Giants (1997 and 2000), Houston Astros (1998–2000) and Kansas City Royals (2001). He was acquired by the Mets on November 30, 1994 in a transaction that was completed when the Brewers received minor-league catcher Javier Gonzalez on December 6 and Fernando Viña sixteen days later on December 22. 

He rejoined the Royals organization as the pitching coach for the Burlington Bees in the Midwest League after spending three years as a pitching coach in the Atlanta Braves organization. During the 2007 season, Henry was the pitching coach for the Single-A Rome Braves in the South Atlantic League.

He helped the Giants win the 1997 and 2000 National League Western Division and the Astros win the 1998 and 1999 NL Central Division.

Henry finished tied for 8th in voting for 1991 American League Rookie of the Year for having a 2–1 win-loss record, 32 games, 25 games finished, 15 saves, 36 innings pitched, 16 hits allowed, 4 runs allowed, 4 earned runs allowed, 1 home run allowed, 14 walks, 28 strikeouts, 137 batters faced, 1 intentional walk and a 1.00 earned run average.

In 11 seasons he had a 34–42 win–loss record, 582 games, 290 games finished, 82 saves,  innings pitched, 611 hits allowed, 346 runs allowed, 310 earned runs allowed, 83 home runs allowed, 341 walks, 541 strikeouts, 17 hit batsmen, 41 wild pitches, 2,911 batters faced, 42 intentional Walks, 2 balks and a 4.19 ERA.

Henry lives in Hartland, Wisconsin.

References

External links

1963 births
Living people
Major League Baseball pitchers
Major League Baseball bullpen coaches
Milwaukee Brewers players
New York Mets players
San Francisco Giants players
Houston Astros players
Kansas City Royals players
Baseball players from Sacramento, California
Baseball coaches from California
Kansas City Royals coaches
Arizona State Sun Devils baseball players
Beloit Brewers players
Stockton Ports players
El Paso Diablos players
Denver Zephyrs players
New Orleans Zephyrs players
Jackson Generals (Texas League) players
Baseball players at the 1983 Pan American Games
Pan American Games medalists in baseball
Pan American Games bronze medalists for the United States
People from Hartland, Wisconsin
Medalists at the 1983 Pan American Games